Dimitar Valov (born 24 April 1949) is a Bulgarian rower. He competed at the 1972 Summer Olympics and the 1976 Summer Olympics.

References

1949 births
Living people
Bulgarian male rowers
Olympic rowers of Bulgaria
Rowers at the 1972 Summer Olympics
Rowers at the 1976 Summer Olympics
People from Montana Province